Janez may refer to:

People:
 Janez (given name), a Slovene given name
 Janež, a Slovene surname

In music:
Janez Detd., a Belgian rock band

May also refer to a semi-pejorative term used in the Croatian North and beyond for Slovenes.